5B is a 2018 American documentary film directed by Dan Krauss and Paul Haggis about the efforts of a group of nurses and caregivers who opened the first AIDS ward in the world at San Francisco General Hospital and changed the way patients were cared for in the 1980s AIDS epidemic.

Verizon Media, with the help of Johnson & Johnson and Academy Award winner Julianne Moore, announced during its Newfront event in New York City on April 30, 2019, that it had acquired and planned to release the documentary.

The film first premiered at the 2018 San Francisco Doc Stories film festival and was later screened at the 2019 Cannes Film Festival on May 16, 2019 and at LA Pride on June 7, 2019. It was released nationwide June 14, 2019 in select theaters, presented by RYOT, a Verizon Media company.

Plot summary
5B is the inspirational story of everyday heroes, nurses and caregivers who took extraordinary action to comfort, protect and care for the patients of the first AIDS ward unit in the United States. 5B is stirringly told through first-person testimony of these nurses and caregivers who built Ward 5B in 1983 at San Francisco General Hospital, their patients, loved ones, and staff who volunteered to create care practices based in humanity and holistic well-being during a time of great uncertainty. The result is an uplifting, yet candid and bittersweet, monument to a pivotal moment in American history and a celebration of quiet heroes, nurses and caregivers worthy of renewed recognition.

Reception
David Rooney wrote in The Hollywood Reporter: "As much as 5B is defined by the still-resonating sorrow of so many deaths, and the conflicted feelings of survivors from decimated communities left with few friends their own age, it's also an uplifting film about profound human decency and generosity of spirit." Guy Lodge of Variety called the film a "straight-for-the-tear-ducts documentary, which seeks first-hand inspiration and optimism amid the wreckage of an unavoidably bleak chapter in recent American history."

Cast
 Alison Moed Paolercio
 Cliff Morrison
 David Denmark
 Mary Magee
 Sasha Cuttler
 Guy Vandenberg
 Dr. Paul Volberding
 Dr. Lorraine Day
 Rita Rockett
 Hank Plante
 Steve Williams
 Mary Asbury
 Leah Cleveland
 Harry Breaux
 George Kelly

Release
5B was featured and was the closing film at the San Francisco Doc Stories 2018 film festival. The film premiered at the 2019 Cannes Film Festival on May 16, 2019, was set for American premiere at Los Angeles Pride on June 7, 2019, and released nationwide on June 14, 2019 in select theaters. At the Cannes Lions awards in 2019, it won a Grand Prix Award in Entertainment, with Jury President Scott Donaton quoting: “5B is a brave idea and a beautiful story that's brilliantly crafted. It can – and will – stand as a piece of great entertainment as well as an example of bold marketing. We need more stories like this, stories that make people care, that reflect a brand's values and that point the way forward for our industry.”

Co-director and producer Paul Haggis's name was removed from the film's Cannes press materials, following allegations of rape and sexual misconduct levied against him in January 2018. His name is listed in the end credits.

References

External links
 
 
 

American documentary films
2018 films
2018 documentary films
American LGBT-related films
2018 LGBT-related films
Documentary films about HIV/AIDS
Johnson & Johnson
Films about viral outbreaks
Films directed by Dan Krauss
Films directed by Paul Haggis
Films set in hospitals
2010s English-language films
HIV/AIDS in American films
2010s American films